The Beautiful Ballads is a 1967 posthumous album of recordings by Nat King Cole. The album was issued after the singer's death by Capitol Records collecting recordings which had not previously been available in LP form. Most of the tracks were previously released as single A-sides or B-sides.

Track listing
"Felicia" (Ray Gilbert, Ulpio Minucci) - 2:15
"Miss Me" (Bob Marcus) - 2:20
"Marnie" - 2:40
"Here's To My Lady" (Rube Bloom, Johnny Mercer) - 3:00
"A Fool Was I" (Roy Alfred) - 2:49
"Bend A Little My Way" (Joel Sherman, Jack Wolf) - 2:25
"You'll See" (Eddie DeLange, Norman Gimbel) - 2:56 originally released as the B-side of "Wanderlust" in 1965
"If I Knew" (Meredith Wilson) - 2:48
"Back In My Arms" (Johnny Mandel) - 3:02
"When It's Summer" (Johnny Burke, Nat "King" Cole) - 2:34
"I'll Always Be Remembering ("Things")" (Dok Stanford) - 2:54

References

1967 compilation albums
Nat King Cole albums
Compilation albums published posthumously
Capitol Records compilation albums